The 2015 Winmau BDO World Trophy is a major darts tournament run by the British Darts Organisation, hosted between 26 February – 1 March 2015 at Event City, Manchester. This event organized by the BDO Events – the new commercial arm of the British Darts Organisation.

Prize Fund
Winner	£10,000	(men), £3,000 (women)
Runner Up  £5,000 (men), £1,500 (women)
Joint 3rd  2 x £2,000 (men), 2 x £1,000 (women)
Joint 5th  4 x £1,500 (men), 4 x £500 (women)
Joint 9th  8 x £750 (men), 8 x £250 (women)	
Joint 17th  16 x £500 (men)	
Totals	£50,500 (£40,000 men, £10,500 women)

Qualifiers

Men

Draw

Sam Hewson replaced Scott Waites who withdrew through shoulder injury.

Women

Draw

Television coverage
The event is live on British Eurosport. The Winmau website will show live coverage of all four days.

References

BDO World Trophy
BDO World Trophy
BDO World Trophy
BDO World Trophy
BDO World Trophy
International sports competitions in Manchester